Gold River is a census-designated place (CDP) in Sacramento County, California. The population was 7,812 at the 2010 census, down from 8,023 at the 2000 census. Gold River is part of the Sacramento–Arden-Arcade–Roseville Metropolitan Statistical Area.  With a median family income of $141,399 according to U.S Census Bureau in 2021, Gold River is the highest-income place in Sacramento County.

The community of Gold River consists of a residential planned development and some smaller subdivisions served by the Gold River Discovery Center (a K through 8 school), as well as some retail, commercial and light industrial areas.  The community consists of detached single family homes, duplex and triplexes, as well as a condominium development.  Gold River lies between the cities of Rancho Cordova on the south, Folsom on the east, and the American River to the north. The Gold River Community Association is the master association for the 25 separate "villages" that make up the planned development. Each village has its own subassociations as well. The planned development and two subdivisions, including Gold Station, opted out of inclusion into the City of Rancho Cordova by resolution and petitions, respectively. The community remains an unincorporated part of Sacramento County.

Geography
Gold River is located at  (38.623392, -121.247845).

Demographics

2010
The 2010 United States Census reported that Gold River had a population of 7,912. The racial makeup of Gold River was 5,837 (73.8%) White, 195 (2.5%) African American, 20 (0.3%) Native American, 1,426 (18.0%) Asian, 28 (0.4%) Pacific Islander, 97 (1.2%) from other races, and 309 (3.9%) from two or more races. Hispanic or Latino of any race were 515 persons (6.5%).

The Census reported that 7,912 people (100% of the population) lived in households, 0 (0%) lived in non-institutionalized group quarters, and 0 (0%) were institutionalized.

There were 3,335 households, out of which 912 (27.3%) had children under the age of 18 living in them, 2,045 (61.3%) were opposite-sex married couples living together, 218 (6.5%) had a female householder with no husband present, 98 (2.9%) had a male householder with no wife present.  There were 92 (2.8%) unmarried opposite-sex partnerships, and 30 (0.9%) same-sex married couples or partnerships. 815 households (24.4%) were made up of individuals, and 420 (12.6%) had someone living alone who was 65 years of age or older. The average household size was 2.37.  There were 2,361 families (70.8% of all households); the average family size was 2.83.

The population was spread out, with 1,583 people (20.0%) under the age of 18, 444 people (5.6%) aged 18 to 24, 1,304 people (16.5%) aged 25 to 44, 3,024 people (38.2%) aged 45 to 64, and 1,557 people (19.7%) who were 65 years of age or older.  The median age was 49.7 years. For every 100 females, there were 90.9 males.  For every 100 females age 18 and over, there were 87.4 males.

The homeowner vacancy rate was 1.4%; the rental vacancy rate was 10.7%.  6,665 people (84.2% of the population) lived in owner-occupied housing units and 1,247 people (15.8%) lived in rental housing units.

2000
As of the census of 2000, there were 8,023 people, 3,180 households, and 2,391 families residing in the CDP. The racial makeup of the CDP was 79.2% White, 1.3% African American, 0.4% Native American, 15.2% Asian, 0.1% Pacific Islander, 1.1% from other races, and 2.8% from two or more races. Hispanic or Latino of any race were 4.1% of the population.

There were 3,180 households, out of which 34.4% had children under the age of 18 living with them, 67.6% were married couples living together, 5.6% had a female householder with no husband present, and 24.8% were non-families. 20.2% of all households were made up of individuals, and 7.2% had someone living alone who was 65 years of age or older.  The average household size was 2.51 and the average family size was 2.91.

In the CDP, the population was spread out, with 24.8% under the age of 18, 3.3% from 18 to 24, 25.8% from 25 to 44, 32.3% from 45 to 64, and 13.9% who were 65 years of age or older.  The median age was 43 years. For every 100 females, there were 92.2 males.  For every 100 females age 18 and over, there were 88.5 males.

The median income for a household in the CDP was $92,028, and the median income for a family was $98,842. Males had a median income of $67,905 versus $48,452 for females. The per capita income for the CDP was $42,341.  About 0.5% of families and 0.9% of the population were below the poverty line, including 0.8% of those under age 18 and 1.9% of those age 65 or over.

Government

Notable residents
 Dan Lungren, former 3rd district Congressman, former California Attorney General, 1998 Republican gubernatorial nominee
 Roberta MacGlashan, Sacramento County Supervisor
 Nasir Gebelli, former Square programmer

Adjacent areas

References

External links
Gold River Community Association
Gold River Community Forum
Gold River Online

Census-designated places in Sacramento County, California
Census-designated places in California